TD Overdrive: The Brotherhood of Speed (Released in North America as simply Test Drive) is a racing video game developed by Pitbull Syndicate and published by Infogrames for PlayStation 2, Xbox and Microsoft Windows.

Gameplay
Like its previous incarnations, TD Overdrive focused on illegal street racing, dodging traffic, and evading the police. It also featured real life locations for its tracks: San Francisco, Tokyo, London, and Monte Carlo. A fully playable version of Pong was also included in the loading screens. Cars from General Motors make a return after being absent from Test Drive 6 as playable cars, but the returning cars may be the same models, but are still the same generation of the models and may be different model years of the cars.

This was the first entry in the franchise to feature a story mode in addition to the arcade mode. Players assumed the role of Dennis Black, a San Franciscan street racer. Black races in an exclusive street racing club on the behalf of another driver named Donald Clark, who had been injured during a race against Vasily Raskolnikov, one of the club's most feared drivers. As Black's victories start to amount, he hears rumors from other drivers that Clark is simply using him to beat Raskolnikov and win his prized Dodge Viper. After Black wins against Raskolnikov, the rumors are proven true as Clark admits to Black that he had been using him just to obtain the Viper. Black then challenges Clark for everything that he has gained over his career, including the Viper. After a series of races set across all four cities, Black wins and Clark surrenders the Viper.

Development
The game was originally announced on 16 March 2001, for a release within the fall on the PlayStation 2. On 24 April, Infogrames announced that the title would also be released on the Xbox, where it would feature graphical upgrades over the PS2 version.

Both versions were shown off publicly at E3 2001 and at Infogrames' "Gamer's Day" event on August 8. In August, the game's release date was moved to the first quarter of 2002.

On September 11, 2001, Infogrames announced that the game would be released as Test Drive Underground, for a March 2002 release on the PlayStation 2. However, it soon reverted to its original name not long afterwards, and its planned release was missed again. The game was later announced to be released under the company's revived Atari banner, and went gold in May 2002.

Reception

Test Drive received "mixed or average reviews" on all platforms according to the review aggregation website Metacritic.

Notes and references

Footnotes

Citations

External links

2002 video games
Atari games
Infogrames games
PlayStation 2 games
2002
Video games about police officers
Video games developed in the United Kingdom
Video games set in London
Video games set in Monaco
Video games set in San Francisco
Video games set in Tokyo
Windows games
Xbox games